The 2013 United States Junior Curling Championships were held from January 26 to February 2 at the Broomstones Curling Club in Wayland, Massachusetts. The winners of the championships will represent the United States at the 2013 World Junior Curling Championships in Sochi, Russia.

Men

Teams
The teams are listed as follows:

Round-robin standings
Final round-robin standings

Round-robin results
All draw times are listed in Eastern Standard Time (UTC−5).

Draw 1
Saturday, January 26, 3:00 pm

Draw 2
Saturday, January 26, 7:00 pm

Draw 3
Sunday, January 27, 8:00 am

Draw 4
Sunday, January 27, 12:00 pm

Draw 5
Sunday, January 27, 4:00 pm

Draw 6
Sunday, January 27, 8:00 pm

Draw 7
Monday, January 28, 8:00 am

Draw 8
Monday, January 28, 12:00 pm

Draw 9
Monday, January 28, 4:00 pm

Draw 11
Tuesday, January 29, 8:00 am

Draw 12
Tuesday, January 29, 12:00 pm

Draw 13
Tuesday, January 29, 4:00 pm

Draw 14
Tuesday, January 29, 8:00 pm

Draw 16
Wednesday, January 30, 12:00 pm

Draw 17
Wednesday, January 30, 4:00 pm

Draw 19
Thursday, January 31, 8:00 am

Draw 21
Thursday, January 31, 8:00 pm

Draw 22
Friday, February 1, 8:00 am

Draw 23
Friday, February 1, 12:00 pm

Tiebreaker
Friday, February 1, 4:00 pm

Playoffs

1 vs. 2
Friday, February 1, 8:00 pm

3 vs. 4
Friday, February 1, 8:00 pm

Semifinal
Saturday, February 2, 9:00 am

Final
Saturday, February 2, 1:30 pm

Women

Teams
The teams are listed as follows:

Round-robin standings
Final round-robin standings

Round-robin results
All draw times are listed in Eastern Standard Time (UTC−5).

Draw 2
Saturday, January 26, 7:00 pm

Draw 3
Sunday, January 27, 8:00 am

Draw 4
Sunday, January 27, 12:00 pm

Draw 5
Sunday, January 27, 4:00 pm

Draw 6
Sunday, January 27, 8:00 pm

Draw 7
Monday, January 28, 8:00 am

Draw 8
Monday, January 28, 12:00 pm

Draw 10
Monday, January 28, 8:00 pm

Draw 11
Tuesday, January 29, 8:00 am

Draw 12
Tuesday, January 29, 12:00 pm

Draw 13
Tuesday, January 29, 4:00 pm

Draw 15
Wednesday, January 30, 8:00 am

Draw 16
Wednesday, January 30, 12:00 pm

Draw 17
Wednesday, January 30, 4:00 pm

Draw 18
Wednesday, January 30, 8:00 pm

Draw 20
Thursday, January 31, 4:00 pm

Draw 21
Thursday, January 31, 8:00 pm

Draw 22
Friday, February 1, 8:00 am

Draw 23
Friday, February 1, 12:00 pm

Playoffs

1 vs. 2
Friday, February 1, 8:00 pm

3 vs. 4
Friday, February 1, 8:00 pm

Semifinal
Saturday, February 2, 9:00 am

Final
Saturday, February 2, 1:30 pm

References

External links

Men's results from CurlingZone
Women's results from CurlingZone

United States Junior Curling Championships
United States National Curling Championships
Junior Curling Championships
United States Junior Curling Championships
United States Junior Curling Championships